Gajadhar Majhi is an Indian politician. He was elected to the Lok Sabha, the lower house of the Parliament of India from Sundargarh, Odisha as a member of the Indian National Congress.

References

External links
Official Biographical Sketch in Lok Sabha Website

1942 births
Living people
Lok Sabha members from Odisha
India MPs 1971–1977
Indian National Congress politicians
People from Sundergarh district
Indian National Congress politicians from Odisha